James Clay Rice (December 27, 1828 – May 10, 1864) was a lawyer from Massachusetts, who became a brigadier general of volunteers in the Union Army during the American Civil War.

Early life
Rice was born in Worthington, Massachusetts on December 27, 1828 to William Rice and Welthea (Cottrell) Rice. He was self-educated for most of his early life and eventually graduated from Yale University. He became a teacher in Natchez, Mississippi, and worked for a newspaper. During this time he began studying law and was admitted to the bar in New York City where he began his practice.

Civil War
When the Civil War began Rice enlisted on 28 May 1861 in the 39th New York Infantry Regiment quickly becoming a captain of Company B and engaging at the First Battle of Bull Run.  Rice was mustered out of the 39th New York Volunteer Infantry Regiment on 12 Sep 1861. The next day Rice became lieutenant colonel of the newly formed 44th New York Volunteer Infantry Regiment (also known as People's Ellsworth Regiment). He fought in the Peninsula Campaign and on July 4, 1862, became the colonel of the regiment. At the Second Battle of Bull Run, Colonel Rice took command of the 3rd Brigade, 1st Division, V Corps when its commander, Daniel Butterfield took command of the consolidated 1st and 2nd Brigades and other ranking officers were wounded on the second day of battle. Rice returned to command of the 44th New York and led it at the battles of Fredericksburg and Chancellorsville. At the Battle of Gettysburg Rice and his regiment were sent to the defense of Little Round Top. During the fighting, brigade commander Colonel Strong Vincent was mortally wounded and Rice once again assumed command of the 3rd Brigade, 1st Division, V Corps and led it for the remainder of the battle. For his service at Gettysburg, Rice was promoted to brigadier general of volunteers on August 17, 1863. In March, 1864 General Rice was in command of the 2nd Brigade, 4th Division, V Corps which he led into action at the Battle of the Wilderness. Rice was mortally wounded at the Battle of Spotsylvania Court House. As he lay dying he muttered the words "turn me over that I may die with my face to the enemy." He died on the Spotsylvania battlefield on May 10, 1864. He was buried at Albany Rural Cemetery, Menands, New York, in section 42, plot 11.

Genealogy
James Clay Rice was a direct descendant of Edmund Rice, an English immigrant to Massachusetts Bay Colony, as follows:
 James Clay Rice, son of
 William Rice (1778 – ?), son of
 Joseph Rice (1745–1826), son of
 Ebenezer Rice (1709–1793), son of
 Ebenezer Rice (1671–1724), son of
 Benjamin Rice (1640–1713), son of
 Edmund Rice (1594–1663)

Legacy
An impressive monument to the 12th New York and Rice's own 44th New York Volunteer Infantry Regiment was constructed on the Gettysburg battlefield.

In the 1993 film Gettysburg, Colonel Rice was portrayed by Joshua D. Maurer and is briefly seen congratulating Col. Joshua L. Chamberlain following the fighting on Little Round Top, informing him of the name of that place.

See also

 List of American Civil War generals (Union)
 Little Round Top

References
 Eicher, John H., and Eicher, David J., Civil War High Commands, Stanford University Press, 2001, .

Notes

External links
 
 Yale Obituary Record

1829 births
1864 deaths
People from Worthington, Massachusetts
Union Army generals
People of Massachusetts in the American Civil War
Yale University alumni
Union military personnel killed in the American Civil War
Burials at Albany Rural Cemetery